Count Joachim von Pfeil (1857-1924) was a German explorer and colonist in Africa and New Guinea.

Biography
He was born at Neurode, in Silesia, studied at the gymnasium of Göttingen. In 1873, he went to Natal. There he learned the vernacular and stayed in the country four years. In 1879, after a visit to Europe, he settled in Orange Free State and with Wilson mapped the course of the Limpopo river. After falling ill, he returned to Germany. In 1884, having entered the employ of the Society for German Colonization, Pfeil went to East Africa with Carl Peters and Karl Ludwig Jühlke, and in 1886 succeeded the latter as general manager of the company in Somaliland. This post he resigned in 1887, and entered the service of the New Guinea Company.

Works
 Studien und Beobachtungen in der Südsee (1899) Describes his travels and explorations in the South Seas.
 Vorschläge zur praktischen Kolonisation in Ostafrika (1887)
 Zur Frage der Deportation nach den deutschen Kolonien (1897)

Notes

References
 

1857 births
1924 deaths
People from Nowa Ruda
People from the Province of Silesia
Counts of Germany
German explorers
People of former German colonies
German explorers of Africa